The 1949 Pittsburgh Pirates season was the 68th season of the Pittsburgh Pirates franchise; the 63rd in the National League. The Pirates finished sixth in the league standings with a record of 71–83.

Offseason 
 Prior to 1949 season: Dick Smith was signed as an amateur free agent by the Pirates.

Regular season

Season standings

Record vs. opponents

Game log

|- bgcolor="ccffcc"
| 1 || April 19 || @ Cubs || 1–0 || Sewell (1–0) || Leonard || — || 29,392 || 1–0
|- bgcolor="ffbbbb"
| 2 || April 20 || @ Cubs || 0–4 || Rush || Dickson (0–1) || — || 11,218 || 1–1
|- bgcolor="ffbbbb"
| 3 || April 21 || @ Cubs || 3–4 || Kush || Muncrief (0–1) || — || 11,599 || 1–2
|- bgcolor="ccffcc"
| 4 || April 22 || Reds || 5–4 || Werle (1–0) || Fox || Casey (1) || 32,167 || 2–2
|- bgcolor="ffbbbb"
| 5 || April 24 || Reds || 2–3 (10) || Gumbert || Casey (0–1) || — ||  || 2–3
|- bgcolor="ccffcc"
| 6 || April 24 || Reds || 3–1 || Chambers (1–0) || Lively || — || 24,444 || 3–3
|- bgcolor="ccffcc"
| 7 || April 25 || Cubs || 8–2 || Sewell (2–0) || Rush || — || 35,373 || 4–3
|- bgcolor="ccffcc"
| 8 || April 27 || @ Cardinals || 7–1 || Dickson (1–1) || Pollet || — || 11,727 || 5–3
|- bgcolor="ffbbbb"
| 9 || April 28 || @ Cardinals || 2–4 || Brazle || Lombardi (0–1) || — || 4,561 || 5–4
|- bgcolor="ffbbbb"
| 10 || April 29 || @ Reds || 3–7 || Fox || Werle (1–1) || — || 20,046 || 5–5
|- bgcolor="ffbbbb"
| 11 || April 30 || @ Reds || 4–8 || Wehmeier || Riddle (0–1) || Burkhart || 4,416 || 5–6
|-

|- bgcolor="ccffcc"
| 12 || May 1 || @ Reds || 10–4 || Chesnes (1–0) || Howell || Casey (2) ||  || 6–6
|- bgcolor="ffbbbb"
| 13 || May 1 || @ Reds || 2–5 || Lively || Chambers (1–1) || — || 24,872 || 6–7
|- bgcolor="ffbbbb"
| 14 || May 3 || @ Giants || 3–5 || Hartung || Dickson (1–2) || — || 33,995 || 6–8
|- bgcolor="ffbbbb"
| 15 || May 4 || @ Giants || 4–11 || Jansen || Muncrief (0–2) || — || 9,874 || 6–9
|- bgcolor="ffbbbb"
| 16 || May 5 || @ Giants || 2–3 (10) || Behrman || Dickson (1–3) || — || 8,422 || 6–10
|- bgcolor="ffbbbb"
| 17 || May 6 || @ Phillies || 3–4 || Meyer || Riddle (0–2) || — || 15,754 || 6–11
|- bgcolor="ccffcc"
| 18 || May 7 || @ Phillies || 6–4 || Gregg (1–0) || Rowe || — || 6,832 || 7–11
|- bgcolor="ccffcc"
| 19 || May 8 || @ Braves || 8–3 || Chambers (2–1) || Sain || Muncrief (1) ||  || 8–11
|- bgcolor="ccffcc"
| 20 || May 8 || @ Braves || 11–8 || Casey (1–1) || Potter || Riddle (1) || 27,211 || 9–11
|- bgcolor="ffbbbb"
| 21 || May 9 || @ Braves || 1–4 || Bickford || Dickson (1–4) || — || 13,706 || 9–12
|- bgcolor="ccffcc"
| 22 || May 11 || @ Dodgers || 5–3 || Werle (2–1) || Barney || — || 22,709 || 10–12
|- bgcolor="ffbbbb"
| 23 || May 12 || @ Dodgers || 6–11 || Branca || Gregg (1–1) || — || 7,455 || 10–13
|- bgcolor="ccffcc"
| 24 || May 13 || Cardinals || 3–2 || Casey (2–1) || Munger || — || 34,893 || 11–13
|- bgcolor="ffbbbb"
| 25 || May 14 || Cardinals || 3–4 || Pollet || Dickson (1–5) || Wilks || 18,914 || 11–14
|- bgcolor="ffbbbb"
| 26 || May 15 || Cardinals || 3–4 || Staley || Werle (2–2) || Wilks || 26,909 || 11–15
|- bgcolor="ccffcc"
| 27 || May 17 || Giants || 3–2 || Chesnes (2–0) || Hartung || — || 30,450 || 12–15
|- bgcolor="ccffcc"
| 28 || May 18 || Giants || 5–3 || Muncrief (1–2) || Jansen || Casey (3) || 14,240 || 13–15
|- bgcolor="ffbbbb"
| 29 || May 19 || Braves || 2–3 || Bickford || Riddle (0–3) || — || 9,586 || 13–16
|- bgcolor="ccffcc"
| 30 || May 20 || Braves || 2–1 || Werle (3–2) || Hall || — || 29,807 || 14–16
|- bgcolor="ffbbbb"
| 31 || May 21 || Braves || 2–8 || Spahn || Dickson (1–6) || Hogue || 16,724 || 14–17
|- bgcolor="ffbbbb"
| 32 || May 22 || Phillies || 5–6 || Roberts || Riddle (0–4) || Konstanty || 31,467 || 14–18
|- bgcolor="ffbbbb"
| 33 || May 24 || Dodgers || 1–6 || Branca || Chesnes (2–1) || — || 29,625 || 14–19
|- bgcolor="ffbbbb"
| 34 || May 25 || Dodgers || 6–8 || Banta || Muncrief (1–3) || — || 13,988 || 14–20
|- bgcolor="ffbbbb"
| 35 || May 26 || @ Cardinals || 6–13 || Wilks || Higbe (0–1) || — || 10,402 || 14–21
|- bgcolor="ffbbbb"
| 36 || May 27 || @ Cardinals || 1–2 || Brazle || Dickson (1–7) || — || 12,110 || 14–22
|- bgcolor="ffbbbb"
| 37 || May 28 || @ Cardinals || 2–4 || Wilks || Werle (3–3) || — || 15,931 || 14–23
|- bgcolor="ccffcc"
| 38 || May 29 || @ Cardinals || 4–2 || Riddle (1–4) || Brecheen || Muncrief (2) || 16,535 || 15–23
|- bgcolor="ffbbbb"
| 39 || May 30 || Cubs || 5–8 || Rush || Higbe (0–2) || — ||  || 15–24
|- bgcolor="ccffcc"
| 40 || May 30 || Cubs || 8–6 || Chesnes (3–1) || McLish || Muncrief (3) || 38,089 || 16–24
|-

|- bgcolor="ffbbbb"
| 41 || June 1 || @ Braves || 6–8 || Hall || Muncrief (1–4) || Potter || 20,153 || 16–25
|- bgcolor="ffbbbb"
| 42 || June 2 || @ Braves || 1–4 || Spahn || Bonham (0–1) || — || 20,130 || 16–26
|- bgcolor="ffbbbb"
| 43 || June 4 || @ Dodgers || 6–8 || Banta || Muncrief (1–5) || — || 18,352 || 16–27
|- bgcolor="ccffcc"
| 44 || June 5 || @ Dodgers || 5–4 (10) || Dickson (2–7) || Barney || — || 25,035 || 17–27
|- bgcolor="ffbbbb"
| 45 || June 6 || @ Dodgers || 1–5 || Newcombe || Chesnes (3–2) || — || 30,053 || 17–28
|- bgcolor="ffbbbb"
| 46 || June 7 || @ Phillies || 5–6 || Rowe || Dickson (2–8) || — || 12,105 || 17–29
|- bgcolor="ffbbbb"
| 47 || June 8 || @ Phillies || 0–2 || Roberts || Bonham (0–2) || — || 10,136 || 17–30
|- bgcolor="ffbbbb"
| 48 || June 9 || @ Phillies || 3–4 (18) || Konstanty || Dickson (2–9) || — || 4,095 || 17–31
|- bgcolor="ccffcc"
| 49 || June 10 || @ Giants || 6–1 || Werle (4–3) || Jansen || — || 6,942 || 18–31
|- bgcolor="ffbbbb"
| 50 || June 11 || @ Giants || 3–4 || Behrman || Riddle (1–5) || — || 14,065 || 18–32
|- bgcolor="ccffcc"
| 51 || June 12 || @ Giants || 6–5 || Sewell (3–0) || Hansen || Casey (4) || 18,149 || 19–32
|- bgcolor="ccffcc"
| 52 || June 14 || Braves || 4–3 || Bonham (1–2) || Potter || — || 29,639 || 20–32
|- bgcolor="ccffcc"
| 53 || June 15 || Braves || 8–7 || Sewell (4–0) || Hogue || — || 15,048 || 21–32
|- bgcolor="ffbbbb"
| 54 || June 16 || Braves || 2–7 || Bickford || Poat (0–1) || — || 12,239 || 21–33
|- bgcolor="ccffcc"
| 55 || June 17 || Giants || 6–4 || Bonham (2–2) || Hartung || — || 32,615 || 22–33
|- bgcolor="ffbbbb"
| 56 || June 18 || Giants || 4–5 || Jones || Riddle (1–6) || Koslo || 17,752 || 22–34
|- bgcolor="ccffcc"
| 57 || June 19 || Giants || 9–4 || Chesnes (4–2) || Jansen || — || 25,413 || 23–34
|- bgcolor="ffbbbb"
| 58 || June 20 || Phillies || 1–7 || Meyer || Werle (4–4) || — || 30,066 || 23–35
|- bgcolor="ffbbbb"
| 59 || June 21 || Phillies || 4–9 || Borowy || Dickson (2–10) || — || 32,332 || 23–36
|- bgcolor="ccffcc"
| 60 || June 22 || Phillies || 12–3 || Lombardi (1–1) || Roberts || — || 8,957 || 24–36
|- bgcolor="ffbbbb"
| 61 || June 23 || Phillies || 3–9 || Simmons || Riddle (1–7) || — || 10,283 || 24–37
|- bgcolor="ccffcc"
| 62 || June 24 || Dodgers || 4–2 || Bonham (3–2) || Barney || — || 34,670 || 25–37
|- bgcolor="ffbbbb"
| 63 || June 25 || Dodgers || 10–17 || Branca || Chesnes (4–3) || — || 19,800 || 25–38
|- bgcolor="ffbbbb"
| 64 || June 26 || Dodgers || 3–15 || Newcombe || Werle (4–5) || — || 39,548 || 25–39
|- bgcolor="ccffcc"
| 65 || June 29 || Reds || 7–3 || Lombardi (2–1) || Erautt || — || 9,003 || 26–39
|- bgcolor="ccffcc"
| 66 || June 30 || Reds || 2–1 || Chambers (3–1) || Fox || — || 8,283 || 27–39
|-

|- bgcolor="ffbbbb"
| 67 || July 1 || @ Cubs || 5–6 || Muncrief || Dickson (2–11) || — || 10,526 || 27–40
|- bgcolor="ccffcc"
| 68 || July 2 || @ Cubs || 8–3 || Bonham (4–2) || Dubiel || Sewell (1) || 16,670 || 28–40
|- bgcolor="ccffcc"
| 69 || July 3 || @ Cubs || 7–3 || Lombardi (3–1) || Hacker || — || 18,128 || 29–40
|- bgcolor="ccffcc"
| 70 || July 4 || @ Reds || 2–1 || Chambers (4–1) || Fox || — ||  || 30–40
|- bgcolor="ccffcc"
| 71 || July 4 || @ Reds || 1–0 || Werle (5–5) || Erautt || — || 15,479 || 31–40
|- bgcolor="ccffcc"
| 72 || July 6 || Cardinals || 4–3 || Dickson (3–11) || Munger || — || 32,983 || 32–40
|- bgcolor="ccffcc"
| 73 || July 7 || Cardinals || 2–0 || Bonham (5–2) || Staley || — || 15,603 || 33–40
|- bgcolor="ccffcc"
| 74 || July 8 || Cubs || 2–1 || Lombardi (4–1) || Leonard || — || 36,336 || 34–40
|- bgcolor="ccffcc"
| 75 || July 9 || Cubs || 6–5 (13) || Sewell (5–0) || Kush || — || 15,924 || 35–40
|- bgcolor="ffbbbb"
| 76 || July 10 || Cubs || 6–8 || Rush || Chesnes (4–4) || Dubiel ||  || 35–41
|- bgcolor="ffbbbb"
| 77 || July 10 || Cubs || 6–9 (6) || Chipman || Werle (5–6) || Dubiel || 26,317 || 35–42
|- bgcolor="ffbbbb"
| 78 || July 14 || @ Giants || 3–4 || Jansen || Werle (5–7) || — || 22,677 || 35–43
|- bgcolor="ccffcc"
| 79 || July 16 || @ Giants || 9–0 || Chesnes (5–4) || Hartung || — ||  || 36–43
|- bgcolor="ccffcc"
| 80 || July 16 || @ Giants || 7–6 (11) || Werle (6–7) || Hansen || Casey (5) || 20,001 || 37–43
|- bgcolor="ccffcc"
| 81 || July 17 || @ Phillies || 2–1 (5) || Chambers (5–1) || Meyer || — || 12,761 || 38–43
|- bgcolor="ccffcc"
| 82 || July 18 || @ Phillies || 7–2 || Dickson (4–11) || Konstanty || — || 4,068 || 39–43
|- bgcolor="ffbbbb"
| 83 || July 19 || @ Dodgers || 3–4 || Palica || Sewell (5–1) || — || 16,387 || 39–44
|- bgcolor="ccffcc"
| 84 || July 20 || @ Dodgers || 8–6 || Chambers (6–1) || Palica || — || 12,381 || 40–44
|- bgcolor="ffbbbb"
| 85 || July 21 || @ Dodgers || 6–7 || Palica || Werle (6–8) || — || 11,947 || 40–45
|- bgcolor="ffbbbb"
| 86 || July 22 || @ Braves || 3–5 || Bickford || Dickson (4–12) || Hogue || 16,958 || 40–46
|- bgcolor="ccffcc"
| 87 || July 23 || @ Braves || 12–9 || Casey (3–1) || Potter || Chesnes (1) || 8,213 || 41–46
|- bgcolor="ccffcc"
| 88 || July 24 || @ Braves || 4–3 || Werle (7–8) || Sain || — ||  || 42–46
|- bgcolor="ccffcc"
| 89 || July 24 || @ Braves || 7–6 || Casey (4–1) || Voiselle || — || 21,986 || 43–46
|- bgcolor="ccffcc"
| 90 || July 26 || Giants || 4–1 || Bonham (6–2) || Hansen || — || 35,041 || 44–46
|- bgcolor="ffbbbb"
| 91 || July 27 || Giants || 3–8 || Higbe || Chesnes (5–5) || — || 19,768 || 44–47
|- bgcolor="ffbbbb"
| 92 || July 28 || Giants || 6–8 || Jones || Gumbert (0–1) || Higbe || 12,653 || 44–48
|- bgcolor="ffbbbb"
| 93 || July 31 || Braves || 1–9 || Sain || Chambers (6–2) || — ||  || 44–49
|- bgcolor="ccffcc"
| 94 || July 31 || Braves || 6–5 || Gumbert (1–1) || Potter || — || 27,105 || 45–49
|-

|- bgcolor="ffbbbb"
| 95 || August 1 || Dodgers || 0–9 || Branca || Bonham (6–3) || — || 29,483 || 45–50
|- bgcolor="ffbbbb"
| 96 || August 2 || Dodgers || 2–5 || Barney || Chesnes (5–6) || — || 27,697 || 45–51
|- bgcolor="ffbbbb"
| 97 || August 3 || Dodgers || 5–10 || Erskine || Riddle (1–8) || — || 13,007 || 45–52
|- bgcolor="ffbbbb"
| 98 || August 4 || Dodgers || 3–11 || Newcombe || Lombardi (4–2) || — || 14,363 || 45–53
|- bgcolor="ccffcc"
| 99 || August 5 || Phillies || 1–0 || Werle (8–8) || Rowe || — || 24,944 || 46–53
|- bgcolor="ffbbbb"
| 100 || August 6 || Phillies || 3–4 || Konstanty || Gumbert (1–2) || — || 13,260 || 46–54
|- bgcolor="ffbbbb"
| 101 || August 7 || Phillies || 3–7 || Borowy || Chambers (6–3) || — ||  || 46–55
|- bgcolor="ffbbbb"
| 102 || August 7 || Phillies || 4–5 || Konstanty || Chesnes (5–7) || Roberts || 27,928 || 46–56
|- bgcolor="ccffcc"
| 103 || August 9 || @ Cubs || 8–3 || Chambers (7–3) || Schmitz || Gumbert (1) || 11,313 || 47–56
|- bgcolor="ffbbbb"
| 104 || August 10 || @ Cubs || 0–2 || Lade || Walsh (0–1) || — || 10,326 || 47–57
|- bgcolor="ccffcc"
| 105 || August 11 || @ Cubs || 3–2 || Werle (9–8) || Dubiel || Gumbert (2) || 5,415 || 48–57
|- bgcolor="ffbbbb"
| 106 || August 12 || @ Cardinals || 2–8 || Staley || Bonham (6–4) || — || 22,231 || 48–58
|- bgcolor="ccffcc"
| 107 || August 13 || @ Cardinals || 6–3 || Dickson (5–12) || Munger || — || 25,745 || 49–58
|- bgcolor="ccffcc"
| 108 || August 14 || @ Cardinals || 4–0 || Chambers (8–3) || Pollet || — || 22,996 || 50–58
|- bgcolor="ccffcc"
| 109 || August 15 || @ Reds || 9–7 || Sewell (6–1) || Wehmeier || Gumbert (3) || 11,371 || 51–58
|- bgcolor="ffbbbb"
| 110 || August 16 || @ Reds || 1–2 (10) || Fox || Chesnes (5–8) || — || 2,526 || 51–59
|- bgcolor="ccffcc"
| 111 || August 18 || Cubs || 2–0 || Walsh (1–1) || Lade || — || 6,922 || 52–59
|- bgcolor="ccffcc"
| 112 || August 19 || Cardinals || 8–2 || Chambers (9–3) || Staley || — || 32,476 || 53–59
|- bgcolor="ffbbbb"
| 113 || August 20 || Cardinals || 3–4 || Pollet || Gumbert (1–3) || — || 20,659 || 53–60
|- bgcolor="ffbbbb"
| 114 || August 21 || Cardinals || 2–4 || Martin || Werle (9–9) || — ||  || 53–61
|- bgcolor="ccffcc"
| 115 || August 21 || Cardinals || 8–0 || Dickson (6–12) || Brecheen || — || 34,408 || 54–61
|- bgcolor="ffbbbb"
| 116 || August 23 || @ Braves || 2–5 || Sain || Chesnes (5–9) || — || 14,405 || 54–62
|- bgcolor="ffbbbb"
| 117 || August 24 || @ Braves || 5–6 || Spahn || Chambers (9–4) || — || 6,467 || 54–63
|- bgcolor="ccffcc"
| 118 || August 25 || @ Phillies || 5–1 || Dickson (7–12) || Meyer || — || 4,548 || 55–63
|- bgcolor="ffbbbb"
| 119 || August 25 || @ Phillies || 2–4 || Roberts || Walsh (1–2) || — || 7,179 || 55–64
|- bgcolor="ccffcc"
| 120 || August 26 || @ Phillies || 3–2 || Werle (10–9) || Heintzelman || — || 9,586 || 56–64
|- bgcolor="ccffcc"
| 121 || August 27 || @ Phillies || 8–2 || Bonham (7–4) || Rowe || — || 6,070 || 57–64
|- bgcolor="ffbbbb"
| 122 || August 28 || @ Dodgers || 0–9 || Newcombe || Chesnes (5–10) || — || 23,663 || 57–65
|- bgcolor="ffbbbb"
| 123 || August 29 || @ Dodgers || 1–5 || Banta || Chambers (9–5) || — || 24,031 || 57–66
|- bgcolor="ffbbbb"
| 124 || August 30 || @ Dodgers || 3–4 || Barney || Dickson (7–13) || — || 13,708 || 57–67
|- bgcolor="ffbbbb"
| 125 || August 31 || @ Giants || 5–12 || Jones || Werle (10–10) || — || 4,701 || 57–68
|-

|- bgcolor="ffbbbb"
| 126 || September 1 || @ Giants || 5–9 || Hansen || Lombardi (4–3) || Higbe || 3,973 || 57–69
|- bgcolor="ffbbbb"
| 127 || September 3 || @ Cubs || 7–11 || Adkins || Chambers (9–6) || Chipman || 13,289 || 57–70
|- bgcolor="ffbbbb"
| 128 || September 4 || @ Cubs || 7–11 (7) || Muncrief || Chesnes (5–11) || Rush || 18,082 || 57–71
|- bgcolor="ffbbbb"
| 129 || September 5 || @ Cardinals || 1–9 || Munger || Dickson (7–14) || — ||  || 57–72
|- bgcolor="ccffcc"
| 130 || September 5 || @ Cardinals || 5–4 (10) || Lombardi (5–3) || Munger || — || 32,214 || 58–72
|- bgcolor="ffbbbb"
| 131 || September 6 || Reds || 3–6 (10) || Blackwell || Walsh (1–3) || — || 11,797 || 58–73
|- bgcolor="ffbbbb"
| 132 || September 7 || Reds || 2–5 || Raffensberger || Chambers (9–7) || — || 12,367 || 58–74
|- bgcolor="ffbbbb"
| 133 || September 8 || Reds || 7–9 || Wehmeier || Lombardi (5–4) || — || 4,170 || 58–75
|- bgcolor="ffbbbb"
| 134 || September 9 || Cubs || 1–8 || Dubiel || Chesnes (5–12) || — || 7,905 || 58–76
|- bgcolor="ffbbbb"
| 135 || September 10 || Cubs || 5–9 || Leonard || Werle (10–11) || Rush || 5,369 || 58–77
|- bgcolor="ccffcc"
| 136 || September 11 || Cubs || 7–3 || Dickson (8–14) || Adkins || — || 9,851 || 59–77
|- bgcolor="ccffcc"
| 137 || September 13 || Phillies || 11–6 || Chambers (10–7) || Borowy || — || 11,878 || 60–77
|- bgcolor="ffbbbb"
| 138 || September 14 || Phillies || 4–12 || Roberts || Walsh (1–4) || — || 3,920 || 60–78
|- bgcolor="ccffcc"
| 139 || September 16 || Dodgers || 9–2 || Werle (11–11) || Newcombe || — || 28,202 || 61–78
|- bgcolor="ccffcc"
| 140 || September 17 || Dodgers || 7–2 || Dickson (9–14) || Palica || — || 14,842 || 62–78
|- bgcolor="ffbbbb"
| 141 || September 18 || Giants || 4–13 || Jones || Chesnes (5–13) || — ||  || 62–79
|- bgcolor="ccffcc"
| 142 || September 18 || Giants || 7–2 (6) || Chambers (11–7) || Behrman || — || 28,291 || 63–79
|- bgcolor="ffbbbb"
| 143 || September 19 || Giants || 4–6 (10) || Jones || Gumbert (1–4) || — || 11,542 || 63–80
|- bgcolor="ffbbbb"
| 144 || September 20 || Braves || 2–4 || Bickford || Lombardi (5–5) || — || 11,348 || 63–81
|- bgcolor="ffbbbb"
| 145 || September 21 || Braves || 7–9 || Hall || Werle (11–12) || — || 11,881 || 63–82
|- bgcolor="ccffcc"
| 146 || September 22 || Braves || 1–0 || Dickson (10–14) || Sain || — || 8,261 || 64–82
|- bgcolor="ccffcc"
| 147 || September 24 || @ Reds || 6–5 || Chambers (12–7) || Raffensberger || — || 2,019 || 65–82
|- bgcolor="ccffcc"
| 148 || September 25 || @ Reds || 7–3 || Chesnes (6–13) || Wehmeier || — ||  || 66–82
|- bgcolor="ccffcc"
| 149 || September 25 || @ Reds || 5–3 || Dickson (11–14) || Fox || — || 9,086 || 67–82
|- bgcolor="ccffcc"
| 150 || September 27 || Cardinals || 6–4 || Werle (12–12) || Munger || Lombardi (1) || 27,283 || 68–82
|- bgcolor="ccffcc"
| 151 || September 29 || Cardinals || 7–2 || Dickson (12–14) || Staley || — || 9,573 || 69–82
|- bgcolor="ccffcc"
| 152 || September 30 || Reds || 3–2 || Chesnes (7–13) || Wehmeier || — || 9,416 || 70–82
|-

|- bgcolor="ccffcc"
| 153 || October 2 || Reds || 4–2 || Chambers (13–7) || Fox || — ||  || 71–82
|- bgcolor="ffbbbb"
| 154 || October 2 || Reds || 5–6 || Raffensberger || Werle (12–13) || — || 40,025 || 71–83
|-

|-
| Legend:       = Win       = LossBold = Pirates team member

Opening Day lineup

Notable transactions 
 May 19, 1949: Ed Bahr and Grady Wilson were traded by the Pirates to the Brooklyn Dodgers for Nanny Fernandez.
 September 21, 1949: The Pirates traded a player to be named later and cash to the San Francisco Seals for Bill Werle. The Pirates completed the deal by sending Steve Nagy to the Seals on September 27.

Roster

Player stats

Batting

Starters by position 
Note: Pos = Position; G = Games played; AB = At bats; H = Hits; Avg. = Batting average; HR = Home runs; RBI = Runs batted in

Other batters 
Note: G = Games played; AB = At bats; H = Hits; Avg. = Batting average; HR = Home runs; RBI = Runs batted in

Pitching

Starting pitchers 
Note: G = Games pitched; IP = Innings pitched; W = Wins; L = Losses; ERA = Earned run average; SO = Strikeouts

Other pitchers 
Note: G = Games pitched; IP = Innings pitched; W = Wins; L = Losses; ERA = Earned run average; SO = Strikeouts

Relief pitchers 
Note: G = Games pitched; W = Wins; L = Losses; SV = Saves; ERA = Earned run average; SO = Strikeouts

Farm system

LEAGUE CHAMPIONS: Indianapolis, Waco

Notes

References 
 1949 Pittsburgh Pirates at Baseball Reference
 1949 Pittsburgh Pirates at Baseball Almanac

Pittsburgh Pirates seasons
Pittsburgh Pirates season
Pittsburg Pir